Devils Corner is an unincorporated community located in the town of Pepin, Pepin County, Wisconsin, United States.

References

Unincorporated communities in Pepin County, Wisconsin
Unincorporated communities in Wisconsin